Torellia mirabilis is a species of small sea snail, a marine gastropod mollusk in the family Capulidae, the cap snails.

Distribution

Description 
The maximum recorded shell length is 42 mm.

Habitat 
Minimum recorded depth is 73 m. Maximum recorded depth is 662 m.

References

External links

Capulidae
Gastropods described in 1907